This is a list of the songs which reached number one on the UK Dance Singles Chart in 1988, according to the MRIB.

References

United Kingdom Dance
1988
1988 in British music